Alka Joshi is an Indian–American author and novelist.

Alka Joshi was born in Jodhpur, India. In the 1960s, Joshi and her family moved to the US when she was nine. She received her BA from Stanford University and her MFA from California College of the Arts. In 2020, she published her debut novel The Henna Artist, part of her Jaipur Trilogy. Inspired by her mother, Joshi began writing the novel in 2010. The Henna Artist was the May pick for Reese Witherspoon Book Club. It has been translated into more than 20 languages and is being made into a TV adaptation by Netflix, starring Freida Pinto. In 2021, Joshi published her second novel The Secret Keeper of Jaipur, the sequel to The Henna Artist.

References

External links 
 Official Website

Living people
20th-century Indian novelists
Indian novelists
Year of birth missing (living people)